Jessica Kate Humble (born 5 July 1986) is an Australian former soccer player who played as a defender. She last played for Australian W-League team Melbourne Victory.

Playing career

Club

Melbourne Victory: 2009, 2012–2014 
After playing one match for the Melbourne Victory in 2009, Humble was called into the team as an injury replacement during the 2012–13 W-League season. She made eight appearances for the club playing in the defender position. The Victory finished the regular season in third place and advanced to the semifinals.

Humble returned to the Victory for the 2013–14 season. During her 14 appearances for the team, she scored one goal and helped lead the team to the Grand Final where the Victory defeated Brisbane Roar 2–0. The win marked the Victory's first Grand Final title in the history of the team.

Honours 
Team
 W-League Grand Final Runners Up: 2013
 W-League Grand Final Winners: 2014

References

External links 

1986 births
Living people
Soccer players from Melbourne
Sportswomen from Victoria (Australia)
Australian women's soccer players
Women's association football defenders
Melbourne Victory FC (A-League Women) players
People from Mitcham, Victoria